Mal 81 is an album by American jazz pianist Mal Waldron recorded in 1981 and released by the Progressive label.

Track listing 
 "Love for Sale" (Cole Porter) – 6:40   
 "Summertime" (DuBose Heyward, George Gershwin) – 6:20  
 "Angel Eyes" (Earl Brent, Matt Dennis) – 5:25  
 "Autumn Leaves" (Johnny Mercer, Joseph Kosma) – 6:58  
 "Body and Soul" (Edward Heyman, Robert Sour, Frank Eyton, Johnny Green) – 6:52  
 "I Surrender Dear" (Gordon Clifford, Harry Barris) – 7:13  
 "Yesterdays" (Jerome Kern, Otto Harbach) – 4:16  
 "All of You" (Porter) – 5:29
Recorded at RCA Recording Studios in New York on June 18, 1981.

Personnel 
 Mal Waldron – piano 
 George Mraz – bass  
 Al Foster – drums

References 

Progressive Records albums
Mal Waldron albums
1978 albums